Doris alboranica is a species of sea slug, a dorid nudibranch, a marine gastropod mollusk in the family Dorididae.

Distribution

References

Dorididae
Gastropods described in 1977